Joseph J. Rothrock (August 2, 1898 – November 16, 1968) was an American college football head coach who was Delaware football program's fourteenth head coach. He led them to a 4–11–1 overall record in two seasons.

Head coaching record

Football

References

External links

1898 births
1968 deaths
Basketball coaches from Delaware
Delaware Fightin' Blue Hens baseball coaches
Delaware Fightin' Blue Hens men's basketball coaches
Delaware Fightin' Blue Hens football coaches
People from New Castle, Delaware
Sportspeople from the Delaware Valley